Deon Cross (born 30 July 1996) is a rugby league footballer who plays as a  for the Salford Red Devils in the Betfred Super League.

He previously played for the Rochdale Hornets, Barrow Raiders and the Widnes Vikings in the Championship, featuring as a er earlier in his career.

In February 2022 Cross made his Salford Super League début against the Castleford Tigers.

References

External links
Salford Red Devils profile

1996 births
Living people
Barrow Raiders players
England Knights national rugby league team players
English rugby league players
Rochdale Hornets players
Rugby league centres
Rugby league players from St Helens, Merseyside
Salford Red Devils players
Widnes Vikings players